Maynooth Post Primary School is a coeducational multidenominational secondary school in Maynooth, County Kildare, Ireland.

Academic
Maynooth PPS offers Junior Certificate, Transition Year, Leaving Certificate Applied and Leaving Certificate courses. Students wear a navy blue jumper, blue shirt, navy and blue striped tie, navy trousers. Girls have the choice of wearing the school's kilt or navy trousers.

History
Maynooth Post Primary opened in 1971 as a Vocational School in the grounds of the Presentation Convent and moved to its present location in 1972 under the auspices of Kildare Vocational Educational Committee (now Kildare and Wicklow Education and Training Board). The school buildings were extended in 1983 and again in 2007. Maynooth is currently looking to build a new education campus, comprising a VEC and a Community College, on a greenfield site further up the Moyglare Road. The new buildings were originally intended to be opened by 2016. Complications in planning permission caused the development to be delayed: construction began in mid-2017.

The new buildings opened in 2020.

Musical program 
As a part of the Transition Year Program, Maynooth Post Primary includes an optional musical production. The students take part as cast and crew and perform the production along with the help of teachers. The 2017 performance was Les Misérables.

Notable alumni
Paul Mescal, actor

References

External links
Official site 
https://twitter.com/maynoothpps

Maynooth
Secondary schools in County Kildare
1971 establishments in Ireland
Educational institutions established in 1971